In measure theory, the Euler measure of a polyhedral set equals the Euler integral of its indicator function.

The magnitude of an Euler measure

See also

 Measure theory

Notes

External links

 Exponentiation and Euler measure

Measures (measure theory)
Measure theory